George Shelton (25 September 1899–1934) was an English footballer who played in the Football League for Exeter City, New Brighton and The Wednesday.

References

1899 births
1934 deaths
English footballers
Association football forwards
English Football League players
Attercliffe F.C. players
Sheffield Wednesday F.C. players
Exeter City F.C. players
New Brighton A.F.C. players